"Mr America" is a song written and recorded by Australian singer Russell Morris and produced by Howard Gable. It was released as a single in December 1970 and peaked at number 8 on the Australian Go-Set chart on 6 February 1971; thus becoming Morris' third top ten single.

"Mr America" also won Morris the 1971 TV Week's Music Awards accolade for "Composer of the Year". The song came third in 'Best Single' behind "Eleanor Rigby" by Zoot and "Eagle Rock" by Daddy Cool.

Track listing
 7" Single
Side A "Mr. America" - 3:43
Side B "Stand Together" - 4:04

Charts
"Mr America" peaking at number 9 in its seventh week on the chart, on 6 February 1971.

References

Russell Morris songs
1970 singles
1970 songs
EMI Records singles
Songs written by Russell Morris